The 1953 Cleveland Browns season was the team's fourth season with the National Football League. Their start of eleven wins before losing their last game was the closest to a true perfect season in the NFL until the 1972 Miami Dolphins. After that fifteen-point loss at Philadelphia, the Browns met the Detroit Lions in the NFL Championship Game for the second straight year; the Lions won again, this time by a point at home.

Preseason

Regular season

Schedule

Note: Intra-division opponents are in bold text.

Game summaries

Week 1 at Milwaukee
In the first-ever regular season meeting between Cleveland and Green Bay, the Browns rolled up 376 yards and Otto Graham completed 18 of 24 yards to highlight a 27–0 season opening win in at the new County Stadium in Milwaukee. The Browns yield 159 yards and allow the Packers to penetrate Cleveland territory just four times.

Week 5 at New York
Graham scores the game's only touchdown on a 4-yard run in the second period as the Browns beat the Giants, 7–0, on a muddy Polo Grounds field. Graham, who attempts only five passes as the inclement conditions, scores after an offsides penalty on Lou Groza's missed field goal attempt gives the Browns a critical first down.

Week 6 vs. Washington
The undefeated Browns make life miserable for Redskins quarterback Eddie LeBaron by intercepting four passes in a 27–3 win at Cleveland Stadium. Tommy James ties his own Browns record with three as Cleveland scores 24 points off turnovers.

Week 8 vs. San Francisco
A Cleveland Stadium crowd of 80,698 watches the Browns dispatch longtime rival San Francisco, 23–21. With the Browns leading 10–0, Graham is knocked out of bounds by defensive back Fred Bruney and elbowed in the face by linebacker Art Michalik, who opens a gash that requires 15 stitches and nearly incites a riot. Graham returns for the third quarter wearing a clear plastic protective bar in front of his face, a device that will evolve into today's face mask. Showing little effect from his injury, Graham leads the Browns to 13 second half points and the victory.

Week 11 vs. New York
The Browns improve to 11–0 by winning a 62–14 laugher over the Giants at Cleveland Stadium. George Ratterman starts in place of Graham and completes 15-of-27 passes for 235 yards and four touchdowns. Graham plays briefly and completes 3-of-4 passes, two for touchdowns. Pete Brewster catches seven passes for 182 yards and three touchdowns in the most productive game of his career.

Standings

NFL Championship Game

Awards and records
 Otto Graham, NFL MVP

References

External links 
 1953 Cleveland Browns at Pro Football Reference (profootballreference.com)
 1953 Cleveland Browns Statistics at jt-sw.com
 1953 Cleveland Browns Schedule at jt-sw.com
 1953 Cleveland Browns at DatabaseFootball.com  

Cleveland
Cleveland Browns seasons
Cleveland Browns